The Imphal River, also known as the Turel Achouba, is a major river in Manipur state, northeastern India which originates from the northern side of Kangpokpi district. It is a tributary of the Manipur River, joining it in Thoubal district. It flows towards Myanmar (Burma), marking the end point at 23°59'49.2"N 93°44'29.7"E. It then goes south meeting Myittha River at 22°53'24.19"N, 94° 5'1.79"E. Myittha river flows towards north and meets Chindwin River (also called as Ningthi River) at 23°11'36.82"N, 94°18'38.28"E. Chindwin river then meets Irrawaddy River at 21°25'23.85"N, 95°16'47.56"E. Irrawaddy river then flows south till it ends at Andaman Sea, adjoining the Bay of Bengal and thereby connecting Imphal city to the sea. Imphal River was used by Japanese soldiers in boats to reach Imphal in World War II.

References

Rivers of Manipur
Thoubal district
Imphal
Rivers of India